Adam Michael Cooper (born August 9, 1977) is an American former professional soccer player and the current head coach of the Saint Mary's Gaels men's soccer program.

Playing career 
Cooper was a four-year player for the UCLA Bruins men's soccer program. During his sophomore and senior seasons, Cooper earned Academic All-Conference honors. Upon graduating UCLA, Cooper entered the 2000 A-League draft, where he was selected 7th overall by the now-defunct Orange County Waves. Cooper played one season with the Waves before retiring from the game as a player.

Coaching career 
In 1999, Cooper began his career by coaching the Calabasas High School boys' soccer team. During his tenure with Calabasas, he helped guide the team to the Frontier League Championship. In 2001, he was hired as an assistant to Saint Mary's College, where he was an assistant coach for the men's soccer team. On December 29, 2005; Cooper was promoted to head coach of the program, which he has held since. In 2007 he was head coach of the junior Team USA at the Maccabiah Pan American Games. In 2018, Cooper guided Saint Mary's to a 18–0–2 record, and a ranking as high as third in the nation. The program went on a 14-match winning streak during this time. At the end of the season, Cooper earned the United Soccer Coaches College Coach of the Year of the year award. In 2019, Cooper guided Saint Mary's to a 16-2-0 record, while remaining undefeated in the NCAA West Coast Conference (WCC). Cooper was named WCC Coach of the Year for a fourth time (2009, 2011, 2018, and 2019)

References

External links 
 Adam Cooper at St. Mary's Athletics

1977 births
Living people
Association football defenders
American soccer players
American soccer coaches
People from Tarzana, Los Angeles
Saint Mary's Gaels men's soccer coaches
UCLA Bruins men's soccer players
High school soccer coaches in the United States
Orange County Blue Star players
A-League (1995–2004) players
Soccer players from Los Angeles